Critical Start is a cybersecurity company based in Plano, Texas, with offices across the United States. The company provides managed detection and response services, endpoint security, threat intelligence, penetration testing, risk assessments, and incident response.

History 
Critical Start was founded in 2012 by former RSA Security executive, Rob Davis, as a response to nation-state attacks that occurred with cybersecurity organizations RSA, Bit9, and others in 2011.

Critical Start announced in March 2018 an agreement to acquire Advanced Threat Analytics, a next-generation security analytics platform, to leverage its Zero-Trust Analytics Platform. As a part of the agreement, Critical Start acquired its native iOS and Android mobile security operations center application.

In August 2019, Critical Start published its second annual research survey reporting that security operations center analysts face an "overwhelming number of alerts each day that are taking longer to investigate". According to an article featured on MSSP Alert, the report surveyed security operations center professionals across enterprises, managed security service providers and managed detection and response providers to evaluate the state of incident response within security operations centers from a variety of perspectives, including alert volume and management, business models, customer communications as well as security operations center analyst training and turnover.

The survey found that more than 8 out of 10 security operations center analysts reported that their security operations centers had experienced between 10 percent and 50 percent analyst churn in the past year. Additionally, 70 percent of respondents investigate more than 10 alerts each day – up from 45 percent the previous year, while 78 percent state that it takes over 10 minutes to investigate each alert, which up from 64 percent the previous year.

Critical Start revealed later that month that they would be expanding to a channel-driven model along with the expansion of the company’s national distributors and network of value-added resellers.

Funding 
In June 2019, Bregal Sagemount, a growth equity firm, invested $40 million as part of the company’s first outside investment. According to Dallas Morning News, the "investment helped accelerate its North American expansion" and partnerships with Microsoft, Splunk, Palo Alto Networks, Cylance, and Carbon Black, and to expand its market presence for the company's managed detection and response services – including new field offices in Los Angeles and New York City – to "serve enterprise customers and its network of channel partners."

DC Advisory served as the exclusive financial advisor to Critical Start. Financial terms have not been disclosed.

References 

Computer security companies
Companies based in Plano, Texas
